Strahinja Urošević (born 4 March 1996) is a Serbian football midfielder who plays for FK Borac Čačak.

References

External links
 
 Strahinja Urošević stats at utakmica.rs 
 

1996 births
Living people
Sportspeople from Pristina
Association football midfielders
Serbian footballers
Serbian expatriate footballers
FK Sloga Kraljevo players
FK Borac Čačak players
FK Radnički 1923 players
FK Šumadija 1903 players
FK Dinamo Vranje players
FK Sloga Petrovac na Mlavi players
FK Kolubara players
Serbian First League players
Serbian SuperLiga players
Serbian expatriate sportspeople in Switzerland
Expatriate footballers in Switzerland